Benjamin Boardman (28 April 1899–1968) was an English footballer who played in the Football League for Stockport County.

References

1899 births
1964 deaths
English footballers
Association football forwards
English Football League players
Macclesfield Town F.C. players
Stockport County F.C. players
Manchester City F.C. players